Cosma Shiva Hagen is an American-born German actress. Although she speaks English, her acting roles have been largely confined to German-language films and television productions. She also starred in an Irish film called Short Order (2005).

Personal life
Born in Los Angeles, California, Cosma Shiva Hagen is the daughter of German singer Nina Hagen and Dutch musician Ferdinand Karmelk. As a child, she lived in London, Berlin, Paris, Ibiza, Lüneburg and Hamburg. Her grandmother was actress Eva-Maria Hagen and her step-grandfather is the East German dissident writer and singer-songwriter Wolf Biermann. Hagen's unusual name was picked by her mother, who claimed she saw a UFO while pregnant. "Cosma" is a reference to the cosmos, and "Shiva" is a reference to the Hindu god Shiva.

Hagen's great-grandfather Hermann Carl Hagen, a German-Jewish banker and economist, was murdered at Sachsenhausen concentration camp in 1945. Her non-Jewish great-grandmother Hedwig Elise Caroline Staadt, wife of Hermann Hagen, was also murdered at Sachsenhausen. Her paternal grandfather Hans Hagen was a Holocaust survivor, being held at a prison in Moabit between 1941 and 1945 until liberation by the Soviets.

Selected filmography
 Das merkwürdige Verhalten geschlechtsreifer Großstädter zur Paarungszeit (1998), as Sandra
 7 Dwarves – Men Alone in the Wood (2004), as Snow White

References

External links

Biography on Rosenthalusa.com

Living people
Actresses from Hamburg
Actresses from Los Angeles
American emigrants to Germany
American people of Dutch descent
American people of German-Jewish descent
German film actresses
German people of Dutch descent
German people of Jewish descent
German television actresses
German voice actresses
Hagen family
Recipients of the Medal of the Order of Merit of the Federal Republic of Germany
Waldorf school alumni
Year of birth missing (living people)
20th-century German actresses
21st-century German actresses